Acrocercops petalopa is a moth of the family Gracillariidae, known from Maharashtra, India. It was described by Edward Meyrick in 1934. The hostplant for the species is Anogeissus latifolia.

References

petalopa
Moths of Asia
Moths described in 1934